To Come and Stay (Doći i ostati) is a 1965 Croatian film directed by Branko Bauer.

See also
Cinema of Croatia
List of Croatian films

External links
 

1965 films
Croatian drama films
1960s Croatian-language films
Yugoslav drama films
Films directed by Branko Bauer
Jadran Film films
Avala Film films
Films set in Yugoslavia